Asrava (āsrava "influx") is one of the tattva or the fundamental reality of the world as per the Jain philosophy. It refers to the influence of body and mind causing the soul to generate karma.

The karmic process in Jainism is based on seven truths or fundamental principles (tattva) of Jainism which explain the human predicament. Out that the seven, the four—influx (āsrava), bondage (bandha), stoppage (saṃvara)  and release (nirjarā)—pertain to the karmic process.

Overview 
The āsrava, that is, the influx of karmic occurs when the karmic particles are attracted to the soul on account of vibrations created by activities of mind, speech and body. According to the Jain text, Tattvartha sutra, translates S.A. Jain:  The karmic inflow on account of yoga driven by passions and emotions cause a long term inflow of karma prolonging the cycle of reincarnations. On the other hand, the karmic inflows on account of actions that are not driven by passions and emotions have only a transient, short-lived karmic effect.

According to Jains, āsrava refers to the influx of very fine matter particles. Champat Rai Jain in his book, The Key of Knowledge writes:

Classification 
There are two kinds of influx, namely:
that of persons with passions, which extends transmigration, and
that of persons free from passions, which prevents or shortens transmigration

See also
Asava
Karma in Jainism
Causes of Karma

References

Citations

Sources 
 

Jain philosophical concepts